Hakea pedunculata is a shrub or small tree in the family Proteaceae comprising approximately 150 species restricted to Australia. This species is found in the Far North region of Queensland and adjacent islands. It has flat, broadly egg-shaped leaves and white, cream or greenish flowers.

Description
It often has knobbly, finely cracked bark, and it branchlets are reddish. Flowering occurs predominantly from April to August and occasionally in February.

Taxonomy and naming
Hakea pedunculata was first formally described in 1883 by Ferdinand von Mueller from a specimen collected by a druggist, W. Anthony Persieh, from a specimen collected near Endeavour River and the description was published in The Australasian Chemist and Druggist. (Hakea persiehana was named in his honour by Mueller in 1886.) The specific epithet (pedunculata) is derived from the Latin word pedunculus meaning "a small, slender stalk", referring to its peduncle- the stalk beneath the inflorescence, which is much longer than in other species of Hakea.

Distribution and habitat
Hakea pedunculata grows north of Cooktown on Cape York Peninsula and on adjacent islands.  It is often found in landward edges of mangroves or semi-swamp areas in low shrubland where Melaleuca is dominant.

Ecology
The woodiness of Hakea is  determined when the fruit ripens and the two valves open displaying a darker and lighter zone. Most Hakea seed are usually dispersed by an environmental trigger rather than when seed matures, quite often by fire. Whilst other species may require sporadic flooding rains to establish. Those species with a greater pale layer tend to retain their seed longer. Hakea pedunculata is unique in the Pedunculata group for its fruit woodiness and swampy habitat.

Conservation status
Hakea pedunculata is considered "least concern" by the Department of Environment and Science, Queensland.

References

pedunculata
Flora of Queensland
Taxa named by Ferdinand von Mueller
Plants described in 1883